Glod is a Roma village in the commune of Moroeni, Dâmbovița County, Romania, having a population of 1,723 as of 2011. Its name is an archaic word for "mud" in Romanian. The village is located near the towns of Pucioasa and Fieni.

Role in Borat
Glod was a shooting location for the 2006 mockumentary film Borat: Cultural Learnings of America for Make Benefit Glorious Nation of Kazakhstan (but was not used in the 2020 sequel), representing Borat's fictional home village of Kuzcek, Kazakhstan.  For the original film, the villagers of Glod were paid the equivalent of four U.S. dollars a day each for their appearances and were told the film would be a documentary about the hardships of rural village life. According to 20th Century Fox, the movie’s comedic nature was obvious to everyone since it included many blatantly absurd and ridiculous scenes, such as one of a cow living inside someone’s house. Fox claims that the production team and star Sacha Baron Cohen each donated $5,000 to the town, as well as paid a location fee, and bought computers, school and business supplies for the residents. Two residents of Glod, Nicolae Todorache and Spiridon Ciorbea (role as Mukhtar Sakanov; a pun name for Mukhtar Shakhanov), hired the services of Edward Fagan to sue the producers of the film, but the lawsuit was thrown out by U.S. District Judge Loretta Preska in a hearing in early December 2006 on the ground that the charges were too vague and nebulous to stand up to legal examination in court.

References

External links

Populated places in Dâmbovița County